Jennifer Chow or Jennifer J. Chow, is an American writer and novelist. A Lefty Award-nominated author, Jennifer’s most recent books are the Sassy Cat Mysteries and the L.A. Night Market Mysteries. The first in the Sassy Cat series, Mimi Lee Gets A Clue, was selected as an OverDrive Recommended Read, a PopSugar Best Summer Beach Read, and one of BuzzFeed’s Top 5 Books by AAPI authors. The latest Sassy novel, Mimi Lee Cracks the Code, was listed as one of 10 New Must-Read Books by Bustle, one of the Best Books Released in November by BuzzFeed, and one of the Best New Mystery Books by PopSugar. The entire Sassy Cat series was called one of the Best Cozy Mystery Series to Read Right Now by Book Riot. Death By Bubble Tea, the first book in the L.A. Night Market Mystery series, hit the SoCal Indie Bestseller List. It was reviewed in the New York Times and featured in CrimeReads’ Most Anticipated Crime Books of 2022, Bustle’s Most Anticipated Books of July 2022, and Book Riot’s Best Mystery, Thriller, and True Crime Books Out in July. Chow has also published other Asian-American novels involving secrets and mysteries. She's active in Sisters in Crime, Crime Writers of Color, and Mystery Writers of America.

Background
Chow received her bachelor's degree from Cornell University and a master's degree in Social Welfare from UCLA (the University of California, Los Angeles). She has performed geriatric work with the elderly, which has influenced her stories. She also currently lives in Los Angeles.

Career

Novels
Chow's debut novel was The 228 Legacy (2013), published by Martin Sisters Publishing, which concerns three generations of females in a Taiwanese American family living in Los Angeles during the 1980s, who each closely guard their personal secrets. The novel was a Honorable Mention in the 2015 San Francisco Book Festival, made the Second Round of the 2013 Amazon Breakthrough Novel Award, and a 2013 Finalist in the IndieFab/ForeWord Reviews' Book of the Year Award.

Chow's next novel was a mystery entitled Seniors Sleuth (2015), published by the CreateSpace Independent Publishing Platform, the first installment in her "Winston Wong Cozy Mystery" series. The book is about a former video game tester named Winston Wong, who attempts to solve a crime that takes place in his senior home, being inspired by Encyclopedia Brown. The novel was a 2015 CLUE Award Finalist, and a 2015 Runner-Up for the Beach Book Festival. Chow also wrote the book under the pseudonym "J.J. Chow." The other two books in the Winston Wong Cozy Mystery series are Robot Revenge (2018) and Wedding Woes (2019). 

The third novel from Chow is a young adult novel entitled Dragonfly Dreams (2015), published by Booktrope Editions. It is a supernatural story centering around a young 17-year-old female protagonist named Topaz Woo.

Chow returned to writing cozy mysteries and published the Lefty Award-nominated Sassy Cat Mysteries with Berkley/Penguin Random House: Mimi Lee Gets A Clue (2020), Mimi Lee Reads Between the Lines (2020), and Mimi Lee Cracks the Code (2021). 

She also wrote the L.A. Night Market Mysteries (Berkley/Penguin Random House): Death by Bubble Tea (2022).

Short fiction
Chow has published a short story entitled "Love Is Fragile" in the February 2016 issue of Over My Dead Body magazine. She has also published two flash fiction stories - "Gratitude" and "Hey Beautiful" in the July 2015 issue of Hyphen Magazine. Chow also published another flash fiction piece entitled "The Delicate Lotus" in the March 2015 issue of YAY! LA Magazine, her short story "The Red Book" in the April 2013 issue of Mouse Tales Press, and a flash fiction piece entitled "Look Again" in the March 2013 issue of Foliate Oak Literary Magazine, which was anthologized in the best submissions print anthology spanning stories from 2012 to 2013.

Other Accolades
Chow has also won second place in The Sacrifice Anthology Contest, an honorable mention in the Project Keepsake Contest, earned finalist standing in the Writer Advice's 7th Annual Flash Prose Contest, and was also an honorable mention in the 2012 Whispering Prairie Press Writers Contest.

Bibliography

Novels
Death by Bubble Tea (2022) (An L.A. Night Market Mystery)
Mimi Lee Cracks the Code (2021) (A Sassy Cat Mystery)
Mimi Lee Reads Between the Lines (2020) (A Sassy Cat Mystery)

 Mimi Lee Gets A Clue (2020) (A Sassy Cat Mystery)
 2021 Lefty Award Finalist for Best Humorous Mystery Novel
 Wedding Woes (2019) (A Winston Wong Cozy Mystery, written under the pseudonym "J.J. Chow")

Robot Revenge (2018) (A Winston Wong Cozy Mystery, written under the pseudonym "J.J. Chow")
Dragonfly Dreams (2015)
Seniors Sleuth (2015) (A Winston Wong Cozy Mystery, written under the pseudonym "J.J. Chow")
2015 CLUE Award Finalist
2015 Runner-Up for the Beach Book Festival
The 228 Legacy (2013)
Honorable Mention, 2015 San Francisco Book Festival
Second Round Finalist, 2013 Amazon Breakthrough Novel Award
2013 Finalist, IndieFab/ForeWord Reviews' Book of the Year Award

Short Stories/Flash Fiction
"Midnight Escapade," Midnight Hour, November 2021 
“Moon Girl,” Brave New Girls: Tales of Heroines Who Hack, July 2018
"Love Is Fragile", Over My Dead Body magazine, February 2016
"Gratitude", Hyphen, July 2015
"Hey Beautiful", Hyphen, July 2015
"The Delicate Lotus", YAY! LA Magazine, March 2015
"The Red Book", Mouse Tales Press, April 2013
"Look  Again", Foliate Oak Literary Magazine, March 2013 (also anthologized in the best of 2012–2013 stories print edition)

External links
TaiwaneseAmerican.org Interview with Jennifer Chow
Official website

References 

Living people
American writers of Chinese descent
Cornell University alumni
UCLA Luskin School of Public Affairs alumni
Year of birth missing (living people)